Anthracinae is a subfamily of bee flies in the family Bombyliidae. There are more than 80 genera and 2,000 described species in Anthracinae.

Genera

Anthrax Scopoli, 1763
Aphoebantus Loew, 1872
Astrophanes Osten Sacken, 1886
Atrichochira Hesse, 1956
Balaana Lambkin & Yeates, 2003
Brachyanax Evenhuis, 1981
Caecanthrax Greathead, 1980
Chrysanthrax Osten Sacken, 1886
Collosoptera Hull, 1973
Conomyza Hesse, 1956
Cononedys Hermann, 1907
Coryprosopa Hesse, 1956
Cyananthrax Painter, 1959
Defilippia Lioy, 1864
Desmatoneura Williston, 1895
Deusopora Hull, 1971
Diatropomma Bowden, 1962
Dicranoclista Bezzi, 1924
Diochanthrax Hall, 1975
Dipalta Osten Sacken, 1877
Diplocampta Schiner, 1868
Epacmoides Hesse, 1956
Epacmus Osten Sacken, 1886
Eucessia Coquillett, 1886
Euligyra Lambkin & Yeates, 2003
Exechohypopion Evenhuis, 1991
Exepacmus Coquillett, 1894
Exhyalanthrax Becker, 1916
Exoprosopa Macquart, 1840
Hemipenthes Loew, 1869
Heteralonia Rondani, 1863
Hyperalonia Rondani, 1863
Ins Evenhuis, 2020
Kapu Lambkin & Yeates, 2006
Laminanthrax Greathead, 1967
Larrpana Lambkin & Yeates, 2003
Lepidanthrax Osten Sacken, 1886
Ligyra Newman, 1841
Litorhina Bowden, 1975
Mancia Coquillett, 1886
Marleyimyia Hesse, 1956
Mesoclis Bezzi, 1921
Micomitra Bowden, 1964
Munjua Lambkin & Yeates, 2003
Muwarna Lambkin & Yeates, 2003
Neodiplocampta Curran, 1934
Ngalki Lambkin, 2011
Oestranthrax Bezzi, 1921
Oestrimyza Hull, 1973
Pachyanthrax François, 1964
Palirika Lambkin & Yeates, 2003
Paradiplocampta Hall, 1975
Paranthrax Bigot, 1876
Paravilla Painter, 1933
Petrorossia Bezzi, 1908
Pipunculopsis Bezzi, 1925
Plesiocera Macquart, 1840
Poecilanthrax Osten Sacken, 1886
Prorostoma Hesse, 1956
Prothaplocnemis Bezzi, 1925
Pseudopenthes Roberts, 1928
Pteraulacodes Hesse, 1956
Pteraulax Bezzi, 1921
Pterobates Bezzi, 1921
Rhynchanthrax Painter, 1933
Satyramoeba Sack, 1909
Spogostylum Macquart, 1840
Stomylomyia Bigot, 1887
Stonyx Osten Sacken, 1886
Synthesia Bezzi, 1921
Thraxan Yeates & Lambkin, 1998
Thyridanthrax Osten Sacken, 1886
Turkmeniella Paramonov, 1940
Veribubo Evenhuis, 1978
Villa Lioy, 1864
Villoestrus Paramonov, 1931
Walkeromyia Paramonov, 1934
Wurda Lambkin & Yeates, 2003
Xenox Evenhuis, 1985
Xeramoeba Hesse, 1956
 † Anthracida Germar, 1849
 † Pachysystropus Cockerell, 1909
 † Palaeogeron Meunier, 1915
 † Tithonomyia Evenhuis, 1984
 † Verrallites Cockerell, 1913

References

Further reading

External links

 

Bombyliidae
Brachycera subfamilies